The Galicia rugby union team is the national and/or representative rugby union team of Galicia. It is organised by the Galician Rugby Federation and has been active since 1999. On 1999 they made their international against Portugal.

Matches
Galicia rugby union team matches:

References

See also
Rugby union in Spain

International rugby union teams
European national rugby union teams